Roveré Veronese is a comune (municipality) in the Province of Verona in the Italian region Veneto, located about  west of Venice and about  northeast of Verona. It is part of the Thirteen Communities, a group of villages which historically speak the Cimbrian language.

Roverè Veronese borders the following municipalities: Bosco Chiesanuova, Cerro Veronese, Grezzana, San Mauro di Saline, Selva di Progno, Velo Veronese, and Verona.

References

External links
 Official website

Cities and towns in Veneto